Alexander H. Jones (December 25, 1869 – April 4, 1941) was a starting pitcher in Major League Baseball who played for five different teams between the  and  seasons. He was born in Bradford, Pennsylvania.

Jones was 20 years old when he entered the majors in 1889 with the Pittsburgh Alleghenys, playing for them one year before joining the Louisville Colonels (1892), Washington Senators (1892), Philadelphia Phillies (1894) and Detroit Tigers (1903). Jones always was a bad luck pitcher either due to injury or playing on a bad baseball team. His most productive season came in 1892, when he posted a 3.31 ERA in 16 combined starts for the Colonels and Senators, but finished with a negative record of 5–14. The rest of the time, he kept jumping between the minors and majors for almost 20 years.

In a four-season career, Jones posted a 7–15 record with a 3.73 ERA in 26 appearances, including 18 complete games and one shutout, giving up 137 runs (54 unearned) on 199 hits and 77 walks while striking out 65 in  innings of work.

Jones died in Woodville, Allegheny County, Pennsylvania, at the age of 71.

External links

Retrosheet

Detroit Tigers players
Louisville Colonels players
Philadelphia Phillies players
Pittsburgh Alleghenys players
Washington Senators (1891–1899) players
Harrisburg Senators players
Johnstown Terrors players
Reading Actives players
St. Paul Apostles players
Paterson Silk Weavers players
Paterson Weavers players
Dayton Old Soldiers players
Buffalo Bisons (minor league) players
Providence Grays (minor league) players
Braddock Infants players
19th-century baseball players
Major League Baseball pitchers
Baseball players from Pennsylvania
1869 births
1941 deaths
People from Bradford, Pennsylvania
Bradford (minor league baseball) players
Jamestown (minor league baseball) players
Washington (minor league baseball) players